Bail' Iochdrach or Baliochrach is a village on Benbecula in the Outer Hebrides, Scotland. Baliochrach is within the parish of North Uist.

References

External links

Canmore - North Uist, Loch An Aba, Eilean Nan Tighean site record

Villages in the Outer Hebrides
Benbecula